Chris Wilson (born January 8, 1969) is an American football coach who served as the defensive coordinator at the University of Colorado. Wilson received a Super Bowl ring when he served as a coach for the Philadelphia Eagles, who defeated the New England Patriots in Super Bowl LII. Before that, he spent two years with the University of Southern California as the defensive line coach. He has also held collegiate coaching positions with the University of Oklahoma, Indiana State, NE Oklahoma A&M, Illinois State, the University of Colorado, Mississippi State, the University of Georgia, and USC. In addition he has done internships with the Dallas Cowboys and Arizona Cardinals. He was part of the Eagles' coaching staff that won Super Bowl LII.

Wilson attended the University of Oklahoma from 1987 to 1991; he obtained a bachelor's degree in communications and lettered in football all four years. He achieved 303 career tackles, was named team captain twice, and in 1992 was a 12th round NFL Draft selection by the Chicago Bears.

Wilson was born in Richardson, Texas. He attended Richardson High School, where he played football and ran track. He is married to Tina who also attended OU. They have a son, Caleb, and a daughter.

References

1969 births
Living people
Philadelphia Eagles coaches
Oklahoma Sooners football players
Indiana State Sycamores football coaches
Northern Illinois Huskies football coaches
Northeastern State RiverHawks football coaches
Illinois State Redbirds football coaches
Mississippi State Bulldogs football coaches
People from Richardson, Texas
Players of American football from Texas
Oklahoma Sooners football coaches
USC Trojans football coaches
Georgia Bulldogs football coaches
Colorado Buffaloes football coaches
Houston Gamblers (2022) coaches